Andrey Petrovich Starostin (11 (24) October 1906, Moscow, Russian Empire – October 22, 1987, Moscow, RSFSR, USSR) was a Soviet football player and author. He was an Honored Master of Sports of the USSR (1940).

He was head of the USSR team (1960–1964, 1968–1970) and  Chairman of the Federation of Moscow football (1971–1987).

Early life 
Starostin was fascinated by football from an early age. In 1916 at the age of ten he made his way, alone, across Moscow, to watch OLLS Moscow play at their football ground in Sokolniki Park. He started playing in 1922, in Moscow in the club team of the MKS.

Career 
He played for clubs in Moscow  Krasnaya Presnya  (1923–1925), Pisheviki (1926–1930), Cooperatsiya (1931, 1934),  Ducat  (1932–1933), Spartak (1935–1942, captain team in 1937–1940).

Starostin was RSFSR Champion 1931 Champion of the USSR in 1935 (5 games, 1 goal), 1936 (Fall), 1938 and 1939. He was the second prize winner of the USSR championship in 1937, the third prize winner – 1936 (c) and 1940. In the USSR championships he played 93 matches and made 4 goals.

He was the winner of the USSR Cup in 1938 and 1939.

He played for the national team of Moscow – 1933–40, RSFSR – 1931–34. For the USSR national team played he played 10 informal matches from 1932–35 respectively, all against the Turkish national team.

He played as a midfielder in hockey and was on the Moscow team from 1929 to 1935. 2nd prize winner of the USSR championship in 1935. He was champion of the RSFSR in 1932, 1927 and 1934 and Champion of Moscow 1928.

He was arrested in 1942 and sent to Norillag.

He entered in the all-time team of the USSR for 50 years (1967).

He wrote various books, including Big Football  (Wiley), 1957, 1959, 1964), The Story of Football  (Wiley, 1973),  Meetings on the Football Orbit  (Wiley, 1978, 1980),  The Flagship of Football  (M., 1988).

Starostin died in 1987 and was buried in the Vagankovo Cemetery.

Recognition 
Starostin was awarded the Order of the Badge of Honor (1937), Friendship of Peoples  (1980) and Red Banner of Labor (1985).

References

External links
 На сайте «Сборная России по футболу»
 Фото могилы
 Сайт родословной братьев Старостиных

1906 births
1987 deaths
Footballers from Moscow
Recipients of the Order of Friendship of Peoples
Honoured Masters of Sport of the USSR
Soviet footballers
FC Spartak Moscow players
Soviet bandy players
Soviet football managers
Burials at Vagankovo Cemetery
Gulag detainees
Association footballers not categorized by position